People's Artist is an honorary title in the Soviet Union, Union republics, in some other Eastern bloc states (and communist states in general), as well as in a number of post-Soviet states, modeled after the title of the People's Artist of the USSR.

Russia
The term is confusingly used to translate two different Russian language titles: "народный артист" (awarded in performing arts, see e.g., :Category:People's Artists of the USSR) and "народный художник" (awarded in some visual arts: painting drawing, and photography, see e.g., :Category:People's Artists of the USSR (visual arts)). Both titles are awarded for exceptional achievements in the corresponding arts.

Some other arts gave rise special titles: People's Architect, People's Writer, People's Poet.

Vietnam

In Vietnam the abbreviation NSND (Nghệ sĩ Nhân dân) is used. This is Vietnam's top artistic award for a living artist – second only to the often posthumous Ho Chi Minh Prize. The youngest ever recipient is the Russian-trained classical pianist Đặng Thái Sơn in 1984. The lesser award of Merited Artist of Vietnam is abbreviated NSƯT.

China 
The People's Artist is a type of national honorary titles. Currently 6 people are rated as this title:
 Lao She, awarded by Beijing Municipality Government in 1951
 Qi Baishi, awarded by Ministry of Culture of PRC Central Government in 1953
 Chang Xiangyu, awarded posthumously by State Council in 2004
 Wang Meng
 Qin Yi
 Guo Lanying, these three are awarded by SCNPC in 2019

See also
 List of People's Artists of Azerbaijan
 Merited Artist of the Russian Federation
 National Artist
 People's Artist of Russia
 People's Artist of Ukraine
 People's Artist of Albania

References

 
Honorary titles